Xu Jiayu (born 19 August 1995) is a Chinese competitive swimmer who specializes in the backstroke. He is the Olympic Silver medalist (2016 Rio de Janeiro) and twice consecutive world champion (2017 Budapest and 2019 Gwangju) in the 100 meters backstroke.

Early and personal life
Xu was born in Wenzhou, Zhejiang. His mother Yu Zhenzhen (余珍珍) is a former swimmer who specialized in the butterfly. He has an elder sister Xu Si (徐思).

Xu started swimming at the age of 4 under his mother's guidance.

Xu is an alumnus of Shanghai Jiao Tong University.

Swimming career

Olympic Games

Xu competed for China at the 2012 Summer Olympics, and won a silver medal in the 100 metre backstroke at the 2016 Summer Olympics. He also won a silver medal in the 4x100 mixed medley at the 2020 Summer Olympics.

Xu is the current national record holder in backstroke races in all distances (50, 100, and 200 metres).
He held the world record in the 100 m backstroke short course from 2018 to 2020.

International Competitions

At the 2014 Asian Games, Xu, Ning Zetao, Li Zhuhao and Li Xiang teamed up to win the men's 4 × 100 metre medley relay. Individually, Xu received silver medals in the 100m backstroke and 200m backstroke. While also receiving a bronze medal in the 50m backstroke.

At the 2016 short course World Championships, Xu won the bronze medal in the 100 metre backstroke.

At the 2017 World Aquatics Championships, Xu became the first male Chinese swimmer to win gold in the 100m backstroke in a time of 52.44 seconds. He also received the bronze medal as a part of the mixed medley relay.

At the 2018 Asian Games, Xu received six gold medals. He swept the backstroke events and was part of the Asian record setting mixed and men medley relays.

At the 2019 World Aquatics Championships, Xu successfully defended his 100m backstroke title with a time of 52.43 seconds. Xu also placed sixth in the 50m backstroke.

Career best times

Long course (50-meter pool)

Short course (25-meter pool)

Key:  WR = World Record, AR = Asian Record, NR = National Record

References

External links

1995 births
Living people
Chinese male backstroke swimmers
Swimmers from Zhejiang
Olympic swimmers of China
Swimmers at the 2012 Summer Olympics
Swimmers at the 2016 Summer Olympics
Swimmers at the 2020 Summer Olympics
2016 Olympic silver medalists for China
Medalists at the FINA World Swimming Championships (25 m)
Asian Games medalists in swimming
Swimmers at the 2014 Asian Games
Swimmers at the 2018 Asian Games
Olympic silver medalists in swimming
Shanghai Jiao Tong University alumni
Sportspeople from Wenzhou
World Aquatics Championships medalists in swimming
Asian Games gold medalists for China
Asian Games silver medalists for China
Asian Games bronze medalists for China
Medalists at the 2014 Asian Games
Medalists at the 2018 Asian Games
World record holders in swimming
Medalists at the 2020 Summer Olympics
Olympic silver medalists for China
21st-century Chinese people